Leone XIII Institute, Milan, is a private Catholic primary, secondary, grammar, sport and science, and science high school, located in Milan, Italy. The school was founded by the Jesuits in 1893.

Overview 
The coat of arms of the school includes the IHS of the Society of Jesus, the cross of St. George which symbolizes the city of Milan, and the seal of Pope Leo XIII of the noble Sienese family of Pecci.

In 2008 the actor and former student Luke Barbareschi publicly denounced cases of sexual abuse against him in the 60s at the Institute, by a Jesuit priest.

The current dean is Gabriella Tona, the first woman and the first lay person to perform this task in Italy.

Notable alumni

Gabriele Albertini
Carlo Acutis
Luca Barbareschi
Luigi Caccia Dominioni
Piero Manzoni
Mario Monti
Massimo Moratti
Guido Morselli
Maurizio Mosca
Gabriele Salvatores

See also

 Education in Milan

References  

Jesuit secondary schools in Italy
Jesuit primary schools in Italy
Educational institutions established in 1893
1893 establishments in Italy
Schools in Milan